Matulevičius is a Lithuanian language surname.

The surname may refer to:
Deivydas Matulevičius (born 1989), Lithuanian footballer
Vytautas Matulevičius (born 1952), Lithuanian journalist, political figure
Blessed Jurgis Matulaitis-Matulevičius, Roman Catholic Bishop of Vilnius 
Ona Matulevičienė, a Lithuanian Righteous Among the Nations
Margarita Matulevičiūtė, Lithianian hammer thrower

 

Lithuanian-language surnames